Bens Run is an unincorporated community in Tyler County, West Virginia, United States. Bens Run had a post office, which closed on November 2, 2002.

Prehistoric earthworks were once located between Bens Run and the nearby community of Long Reach. The Archaeology Section of the West Virginia Geological and Economic Survey formally noted the earthworks in 1965, by which point there were no remaining signs of their existence.

Climate
The climate in this area is characterized by hot, humid summers and generally mild to cool winters.  According to the Köppen Climate Classification system, Bens Run has a humid subtropical climate, abbreviated "Cfa" on climate maps.

References

Unincorporated communities in Tyler County, West Virginia
Unincorporated communities in West Virginia
West Virginia populated places on the Ohio River